Derbyshire County Cricket Club in 1969 represents the cricket season when the English club Derbyshire had been playing for ninety-eight years. They were runners-up in the Gillette Cup.  In the County Championship, they won three matches to finish sixteenth in their sixty-fifth season in the Championship. In the first season of the John Player League they ended fifteenth after winning five matches.

1969 season

Derbyshire played 24 games in the County Championship, one match against Oxford University, and one against the touring New Zealanders. They won three first class matches altogether and lost five, the majority of matches ending in a draw. Derbyshire reached the final of the Gillette Cup where they lost to Yorkshire. This was the season in which the Sunday League was introduced and Derbyshire won five matches in the one-day games to finish fifteenth. Derek Morgan was in his fifth season as captain. Peter Gibbs scored most runs overall although Michael Page was top scorer in the County Championship. Harold Rhodes took most wickets.

Matches

First Class

John Player League

Gillette Cup

Statistics

Competition batting averages

Statistics

Competition batting averages

Competition bowling averages

Wicket Keeping
Bob Taylor
County Championship Catches 49, Stumping 5
John Player League Catches 19, Stumping 2
Gillette Cup Catches 9, Stumping 0

See also
Derbyshire County Cricket Club seasons
1969 English cricket season

References

1969 in English cricket
Derbyshire County Cricket Club seasons